The Statutory Professorship in the Analysis of Partial Differential Equations is a chair at the Mathematical Institute of the University of Oxford, England. Since its inception in 2009, the chair has been held by Professor Gui-Qiang Chen. It is associated with Keble College, Oxford.  


Holders of the chair 
 2009– Prof. Gui-Qiang George Chen

See also 
 List of professorships at the University of Oxford

References

External links 
 * Professor Gui-Qiang G. Chen's profile at Oxford

Keble College, Oxford
Mathematics education in the United Kingdom
Professorships at the University of Oxford
2009 establishments in England